Quarten is a municipality in the Wahlkreis (constituency) of Sarganserland, in the canton of St. Gallen, Switzerland, above Lake Walensee. Besides Quarten itself, the municipality includes the settlements of Oberterzen, Unterterzen, Quinten, Mols, Murg, and parts of Tannenbodenalp.

History
Quarten is first mentioned about 840 as in Quarto.

Geography

The settlements of Murg, Unterterzen and Mols lie along the southern shoreline of the Walensee, overlooked by Quarten and Oberterzen at a slightly higher altitude. The hamlet of Quinten lies on the north shore of the Walensee, and is only accessible by boat or on foot.

Quarten is located in the Sarganserland district. Of this area, 33.5% is used for agricultural purposes, while 45.7% is forested. Of the rest of the land, 3.5% is settled (buildings or roads) and the remainder (17.2%) is non-productive (rivers or lakes).

Coat of arms
The blazon of the municipal coat of arms is Per pale Gules a Crosier Argent and Argent a Roman Numeral IV Gules.  Quarten (or a fourth), like Brüntsch (Primsch in Romansh or first in English), Gunz (Seguns in Romansh or second in English), Terzen (third) and Quinten (fifth), was the fourth courtyard of the bishop of Chur.

Demographics
, about 17.3% of the population was made up of foreign nationals. Of the foreign population,, 27 are from Germany, 29 are from Italy, 311 are from ex-Yugoslavia, 9 are from Austria, 56 are from Turkey,  and 89 are from another country. Over the last 10 years the population has decreased at a rate of -4.5%. Most of the population speaks German (87.7%), with Serbo-Croatian being second most common ( 3.6%) and Albanian being third ( 3.1%). Of the Swiss national languages, 2,411 speak German, 12 people speak French, 18 people speak Italian, and 11 people speak Romansh.

The age distribution, in Quarten is; 345 children or 12.6% of the population are between 0 and 9 years old and 400 teenagers or 14.6% are between 10 and 19.  Of the adult population, 360 people or 13.1% of the population are between 20 and 29 years old.  405 people or 14.7% are between 30 and 39, 384 people or 14.0% are between 40 and 49, and 342 people or 12.4% are between 50 and 59.  The senior population distribution is 227 people or 8.3% of the population are between 60 and 69 years old, 184 people or 6.7% are between 70 and 79, there are 96 people or 3.5% who are between 80 and 89, and there are 6 people or 0.2% who are between 90 and 99.

 there were 301 persons (or 10.9% of the population) who were living alone in a private dwelling.  There were 499 (or 18.2%) persons who were part of a couple (married or otherwise committed) without children, and 1,567 (or 57.0%) who were part of a couple with children.  There were 150 (or 5.5%) people who lived in single parent home, while there are 21 persons who were adult children living with one or both parents, 10 persons who lived in a household made up of relatives, 33 who lived household made up of unrelated persons, and 168 who are either institutionalized or live in another type of collective housing.

In the 2007, 2011 and 2015 federal election the most popular party was the SVP which received 42.2% (2007; 39.4% in 2011 and 47.1% in 2015) of the vote.  The next two most popular parties were the CVP (29.4% in 2007; 23.2% in 2011; 17.8% in 2015), and the FDP (10.1% in 2007; 10.0% in 2011; 11.4% in 2015).

In Quarten about 61.9% of the population (between age 25-64) have completed either non-mandatory upper secondary education or additional higher education (either university or a Fachhochschule).  Out of the total population in Quarten, the highest education level completed by 704 people (25.6% of the population) was Primary, while 953 (34.7%) have completed their secondary education, 171 (6.2%) have attended a Tertiary school, and 145 (5.3%) are not in school.  The remainder did not answer this question.

The historical population is given in the following table:

Transportation
The municipality is located on the A3 motorway. There exists a cablecar from Unterterzen via Oberterzen to Tannenbodenalp. Unterterzen has a train station, where (as of 2016) the S4 (circling around the Säntis mountain range) and (on weekends) the S2 (Zurich Main Station & Airport) stop. There is also a connecting bus to Walenstadt, giving access to the hourly Zürich-Chur express train service. There is another station in Murg, served by the S4. The station in In Mols closed in December 2021.

Economy
, Quarten had an unemployment rate of 1.21%.  , there were 152 people employed in the primary economic sector and about 60 businesses involved in this sector.  225 people are employed in the secondary sector and there are 39 businesses in this sector.  477 people are employed in the tertiary sector, with 84 businesses in this sector.

 the average unemployment rate was 2.8%.  There were 192 businesses in the municipality of which 39 were involved in the secondary sector of the economy while 97 were involved in the third.

 there were 640 residents who worked in the municipality, while 737 residents worked outside Quarten and 210 people commuted into the municipality for work.

Religion
Of the rest of the population, there are 2 individuals (or about 0.07% of the population) who belong to the Christian Catholic faith, there are 90 individuals (or about 3.27% of the population) who belong to the Orthodox Church, and there are 5 individuals (or about 0.18% of the population) who belong to another Christian church. There are 238 (or about 8.66% of the population) who are Islamic. There are 1 individuals (or about 0.04% of the population) who belong to another church (not listed on the census), 122 (or about 4.44% of the population) belong to no church, are agnostic or atheist, and 97 individuals (or about 3.53% of the population) did not answer the question.

Transportation
The municipality is located on the A3 motorway. There exist railway stations in Murg, Unterterzen and Mols. A ferry service is running between Murg and Quinten.

Gallery

References

External links

 Official website 
 

Municipalities of the canton of St. Gallen
Populated places on the Walensee